Hollywood, West Virginia may refer to:

Hollywood, Raleigh County, West Virginia, an unincorporated community
Hollywood, Monroe County, West Virginia, an unincorporated community